Key pattern is the generic term for an interlocking geometric motif made from straight lines or bars that intersect to form rectilinear spiral shapes. According to Allen and Anderson, the negative space between the lines or bars of a key pattern “resemb[es] the L- or T-shaped slots in an ordinary key to allow it to pass the wards of the lock.” 

Key patterns have been discovered and used in ornamentation by a number of global cultures in human history, and are thought to largely have been designed independently of each other. The earliest examples of key patterns are seen in textile ornaments from Mezin, Ukraine, dated to approximately 23,000 B.C. Key patterns were also common in textile and ceramic ornamentation during the Neolithic period, with examples found among archeological discoveries in present-day Fiji, Peru, Mexico, Moldova, Romania, Hungary, Yugoslavia, and Greece, as well as in pre-Christian Celtic art. The oldest known pair of pants, wool trousers found in a grave dated to approximately 1038-926 B.C. in present-day western China, have a decorative band of key patterns woven into them. In addition, extant examples of early medieval Insular art, such as stone decorations and illuminated manuscripts, as well as Japanese, Chinese, and Islamic decorative arts from different periods, feature key patterns. 

Celtic mazes, Greek frets, and xicalcoliuhquis are examples of well-known designs that are considered to be key patterns.

Gallery

References 

Patterns